The 1924 Saint Louis Billikens football team was an American football team that represented Saint Louis University during the 1924 college football season. In their second season under head coach Dan J. Savage, the Billikens compiled a 6–3 record and outscored their opponents, 110 to 90. The team played its home games at St. Louis University Athletic Field on the school's campus in St. Louis.

Schedule

References

Saint Louis
Saint Louis Billikens football seasons
Saint Louis Billikens football